Hans Trier Hansen (15 May 1893 – 12 September 1980) was a Danish gymnast who competed in the 1912 Summer Olympics and perhaps also in the 1920 Summer Olympics.

He was part of the Danish team, which was able to win the silver medal in the gymnastics men's team, Swedish system event in 1912.

According to the IOC medal database he was also a member of the Danish team in 1920, which won the gold medal in the gymnastics men's team, free system event.

References

External links
profile

1893 births
1980 deaths
Danish male artistic gymnasts
Gymnasts at the 1912 Summer Olympics
Gymnasts at the 1920 Summer Olympics
Olympic gymnasts of Denmark
Olympic gold medalists for Denmark
Olympic silver medalists for Denmark
Olympic medalists in gymnastics
Medalists at the 1920 Summer Olympics
Medalists at the 1912 Summer Olympics